This is a list of defunct airlines of Jordan.

See also

 List of airlines of Jordan
 List of airports in Jordan

References

Jordan
Airlines
Airlines, defunct